is a passenger railway station located in the city of Fujisawa, Kanagawa, Japan and operated by the private railway operator Odakyu Electric Railway.

Lines
It lies 49.6 kilometers from the Shinjuku terminus.

Station layout
The station consists of two opposed side platforms serving two tracks, with an elevated station building above the platforms and tracks.

Platforms

History
Commuter express services were initiated in 1962 to handle the large volume of traffic commuting towards Tokyo. The station building was reconstructed in 1995. The station received its present name on August 22, 1998.

Passenger statistics
In fiscal 2019, the station was used by an average of 29,802 passengers daily.

The passenger figures for previous years are as shown below.

Surrounding area
Rokukai Junior High School
Rokukai Elementary School
 Nihon University Shonan Campus (College of Bioresource Sciences, Junior College)
 Nihon University Fujisawa High School / Junior High School
 Tama University Shonan Campus
Fujisawa Technical High School
Fujisawa School for the Disabled

See also
 List of railway stations in Japan

References

External links

  

Railway stations in Kanagawa Prefecture
Railway stations in Japan opened in 1929
Odakyū Enoshima Line
Railway stations in Fujisawa, Kanagawa